Stylez may refer to:

Million Stylez, or Kenshin Iryo (born 1981), Swedish dancehall artist
Stylez G. White (born 1979), American football defensive end for the Tampa Bay Buccaneers of the National Football League

See also
Mystic Stylez, the 1995 debut album of the American hip hop group, Three 6 Mafia